The Dumas Commercial Historic District encompasses the historic commercial heart of the rural community of Dumas, Arkansas, in the Mississippi River delta region of southeastern Arkansas.  The town of Dumas was established in 1904, after the St. Louis, Iron Mountain and Southern Railway was built through the farm of William Dumas.  The town's oldest surviving commercial building, the Porter Grocery, was one of several built by David Porter between 1905 and 1938.  The historic district includes eight noteworthy buildings, including the Merchants & Farmers Bank building, a Colonial Revival National Register-listed building designed by Charles L. Thompson.  All of the buildings occupy a single city block of South Main Street, between Choctaw and Waterman Streets.  Most of the buildings of interest were built in the 1920s, and are vernacular brick commercial buildings.

The district was listed on the National Register of Historic Places in 2007.

See also
National Register of Historic Places listings in Desha County, Arkansas

References

Colonial Revival architecture in Arkansas
Buildings designated early commercial in the National Register of Historic Places
Buildings and structures completed in 1905
Geography of Desha County, Arkansas
Historic districts on the National Register of Historic Places in Arkansas
National Register of Historic Places in Desha County, Arkansas
1905 establishments in Arkansas